Power hitter is a term used in baseball for a skilled player that has a higher than average ability in terms of his batting, featuring a combination of dexterity and personal strength that likely leads to a high number of home-runs as well as doubles and triples. In baseball, a power hitter typically bats fourth or "Cleanup" in a Major League lineup, which consists of 9 hitters in a rotating order. 

In terms of detailed analysis, looking at a player's ability as a power hitter often involves using statistics such as someone's 'slugging percentage' (a function that's calculated by evaluating someone's number of moments at bat in relation to the nature of their hits and strikes). 'Isolated Power' (ISO), a measure showing the number of extra bases earned per time at bat that's calculated by subtracting someone's batting average from his slugging percentage, is another statistic used.

The concept generally is analogous to that of a power pitcher, a player who relies on the velocity of his pitches (perhaps at the expense of accuracy) and a high record of strikeout associated with them (statistics such as strikeouts per nine innings pitched are common measures).

Famous power hitters in baseball history

Barry Bonds, who set the record for the most home runs in a season in Major League Baseball history, is often cited as a power hitter. His career was later bogged down by allegations regarding performance enhancing drugs. However, he managed a total of 762 home runs while also earning a comparatively high ISO compared to his rivals, with the publication Business Insider labeling him #3 in a list of the greatest power hitters of all time.

Prior to Barry Bonds breaking the single season home run record in 2001, Sammy Sosa and Mark McGwire closely competed for the record in 1998 with Sosa finishing at a respective 66 home runs and McGwire with a respective 70 home runs to secure the title.

Other baseball figures so cited include the famous hitters Babe Ruth, Hank Aaron, Lou Gehrig, and Ted Williams. Popular newspaper writer Victor O. Jones wrote about Williams in particular, "Ted is lucky to come along in a baseball age that worships on the shrine of power, pure, unadulterated power."

See also

List of Major League Baseball career home run leaders
List of Major League Baseball career slugging percentage leaders
Power pitcher
Triple Crown (baseball)

References

Baseball strategy
Baseball terminology